2008 World Tour LIVE! –– Coliseo de Puerto Rico is the first live compilation album from Puerto Rican singer-songwriter Ivy Queen, released on August 12, 2008 in a two-disc box set. Disc one being a CD and disc two being a DVD. It featured performances by Queen along with Ken-Y, Divino, Jadiel, La Sista and Wisin & Yandel.

The album peaked at number seventy-two on the Billboard Latin Albums chart and number seven on the Billboard Latin Rhythm Albums chart. The album produced one single, a studio track entitled "Dime", which peaked at number eight on the Billboard Latin Songs chart, number four on the Billboard Tropical Songs chart and number one on the Billboard Latin Rhythm Songs chart.

Songs performed on the set list of the concert included repertoire from her most recent studio album, Sentimiento, (2007) as well as Diva (2003), Real (2004), Flashback (2005).

Background
After the success of her 2007 effort Sentimiento, which would be certified Platinum by the United States Recording Industry Association of America (RIAA), Ivy Queen embarked on recording a live album at the José Miguel Agrelot Coliseum, the biggest indoor arena dedicated to entertainment in Puerto Rico. The live album, later known as Ivy Queen 2008 World Tour LIVE!, feature performances of songs from previously released albums including Diva (2003), Real (2004), Flashback (2005) and Sentimiento.

It included two studio tracks, which were both serviced to radio. These two were "Dime" and its respective bachata version. It was featured on the album as the intro and closing tracks and was not performed on the setlist of the tour; According to Queen, she and her management decided to include it on the album as a "gift". It was selected as the second most notable release for the week of August 12, 2008 behind Daddy Yankee's Talento De Barrio by Tijana Ilich of About.com.

Composition

Song structure and lyrical content
"Dime" is a blend of reggaetón and bachata known as bachaton or bachateo, a musical movement in the Dominican Republic and Puerto Rico which combines bachata melodies and reggaeton style beats, lyrics, rapping, and disc jockeying. Ivy Queen described the song as being "a sentimiental subject where we fused bachata and urban rhythms. While reviewing the song "Peligro de Extinción", Jonathan Bogart called "Dime" the "prettiest single" Ivy Queen had ever released. "Que Lloren" has been described as being "hectic", "frenzied" and "hardcore reggaeton". It features minor key tonality, bowed strings, a string ensemble and elements of techno music.
The song's lyrics show a woman's view of romance and the stereotype that men shouldn't show emotions. "Libertad", being was composed in minor key, features danceable grooves, synthetic instrumentation and synthesizers as she takes influences from Afro-Latin music. Queen appears infuriated in the lyrics where she asks a former lover "who the hell am I so that you may play with my heart. This has finished. Go look for another idiotic stupid woman. I'm going to the club with a miniskirt to celebrate my freedom." "En Que Fallamos" is another "hardcore reggaeton" song. Ivy Queen described the song as being what happened to her when a relationship ended. She said it is very "honest and straightforward "explaining that she wanted to "show people the stormy times that I lived." Ivy Queen worked with Puerto Rican rapper Ken-Y, one half of the reggaeton duo R.K.M & Ken-Y on the "romantic" remix to the song.

"Papi Te Quiero" was composed by Ivy Queen herself. It was produced by Tony "CD" Kelly and Rafi Mercenario. This was the start of a musical relationship between Queen and Mercenario, who later produced Ivy Queen's biggest hits including "Chika Ideal", "Cuéntale" and "Libertad". The song samples Sean Paul's "Like Glue" which in turn samples T.O.K.'s "Money 2 Burn". The original version of the song blends reggaeton with the beat of "Like Glue", however the English version features the same beat as "Like Glue". On digital editions of the album, Anthony Kelly, co-writer of "Like Glue", is credited as being featured on the song, though, provides no vocals. An example of this can be seen on Rihanna's "We Found Love" where Calvin Harris is credited as being on the song but provides no vocals. "Papi Te Quiero", named one of the album's biggest hits, "pairs a straightforward love song with the well known Reggae riddim Buyout." Ramiro Burr of Billboard stated "Papi Te Quiero" shows "how effortlessly and quickly she alternately sings and raps" while claiming that she has a "distinct vocal style that evokes Gwen Stefani". Although the literal translation of "Papi Te Quiero" is "Daddy I Love You", the song is not directed towards Queen's father but more to her love interest; "Papi" in Hispanic-speaking countries can also mean "babe" or "baby". "Pobre Corazón" was composed by Daniel Vazquez known by his stage name as Divino alongside Ivy Queen. Production was handled by Marcos Sánchez while Queen served as executive producer. Lyrically, the balad, touches familiar themes such as "devotion, heart-break, hope and reconciliation". "Sentimientos", the title track, was written by Ivy Queen herself. The song was recorded at Marroneo Studios in Bayamón, Puerto Rico along with "Indecisiones" and "En Que Fallamos" from the album. It is also a bachaton track. It features minor key tonality, mixed acoustic and electric instrumentation, bowed strings, a string ensemble, and ambient synthesizers. Ivy Queen indicated that the song emphasized human connection over material things, stating that "What I wanted to say in the song is that material things have never been important to me.... I look for genuine feelings, honesty, the things that come from the heart, because the material things I can get." In another interview, she identified the song as the one that best represented her at that time, explaining, "if you think you can only conquer me if you're famous, rich and have an expensive car, you're wrong, because I'm a woman who needs affection, someone to open the door for me, to bring me flowers and sing to me."

"Quiero Bailar" was written by Ivy Queen. It was produced by the Puerto Rican reggaetón producer Iván Joy. Originally featured on Iván Joy's reggaetón compilation album, The Majestic (2002), the song was also later included on Queen's fifth studio album, Flashback (2005) and second compilation album, Reggaeton Queen (2006) and first EP, e5 (2006). The song incorporates the Liquid riddim, a musical riddim produced by the "Jamaican cross-over guru" Jeremy Harding. The song's lyrics warn her dance partner not to misinterpret her moves. In the song, she berates a lover who thinks that just because they dance she is automatically going to bed with him. Jonathan Widran of AllMusic described the track as a song that "gets the party and people moving" and as well as being one of Ivy Queen's hits. Kid Curry, PD of Rhythmic Top 40 WPOW (Power 96) cites Ivy Queen's release of "Yo Quiero Bailar" as "the last reggaetón super-hit". "Te He Querido, Te He Llorado" is the third bachaton track on the album. Ivy Queen uses "bachata's signature guitar sound" and "slower more romantic rhythm" while incorporating "bachata's exaggerated emotional singing style" in this song as well as in "La Mala". It features major key tonality, simple harmonic progressions, "angry-romantic" lyrics, Puerto Rican and Caribbean roots and Afro-Latin as well as Caribbean influences according to the Music Genome Project. According to Jesus Trivino of Latina magazine, "Te He Querido, Te He Llorado" is the best song released by Queen during "Reggaetón's Golden Era" which lasted from 2003 until 2007.

Track listing
Disc 1

Notes
The track "Dime" which appears as track eighteen was the version of the song that was serviced to radio.

Personnel
Adapted from the album's liner notes.

Technical
 General Director: Liz Imperio & Chad Carlbert
 Camera Director: Eric Delgado
 Cameras: Freddie Hernandez, Edgar Colon, Carlos Marrero, Juan Nadal, Robert Méndez
 P2 Technicians: Hector Santos
 Editor: Heriberto Diaz
 Mixing Engineer: Arnaldo Santo “Naldo” & Miguel Pequero
 Production Manager: Otiz Negron
 Stage Manager: Robert Santiago
 Sound: Comco Audio
 Sound Engineer Monitors: Ryan Vargas
 Sound Engineer FOH: Manuel Comulada
 Lights: Robert Machado
 Lighting Designer: Robert Machado
 Lighting Programmer: Carlos Rivera
 Video Graphics Designer: Holy Chen
 Video Engineer: Pedro Santiago
 Pyros: Musique Express
 Pyros Tech: Richard Nuñez

Musical
 Musical Director: Miguel Márquez “Escobar”
 Acoustic Guitar “Corazón Anestesiado”: Carlos “Chaveta” Torres
 Bass: José Aponte
 Guitar: Juan C. Rodríguez
 Keyboards:  Andres Arroyo “Zoprano”
 Drums: Antonio Alonso “Papito”
 Percussion: Omar Soto “Pooh”
 Güira: Lionel Rodríguez “Leo”
 Chorus 1: Julio Cartagena “Corbata”
 Chorus 2: Zulma Oviedo
 Chorus 3: Orlando Rosario “Orlandito”
 Band Boy: Carmelo Faria “Tete”
 DJ: David Montañez “DJ Davey”

Performance
 Choreographers: Liz Imperio, Jesse Santos & Naydimar Ortiz
 Dancer 1: Naydimar Ortiz Concepcion
 Dancer 2: Lucia Santiago Guzmán
 Dancer 3: Lorainne Rodríguez Rosa
 Dancer 4: Juliecelys Melendez Lopez
 Dancer 5: Mayrelis Cordero Muriel
 Dancer 6: Tania Medina Bernier
 Dancer 7: José Martinez Suarez
 Dancer 8: Nelson Figueroa Rosa
 Dancer 9: Egardo Cotto Rosa
 Dancer 10: Roberto Rivera Rodríguez  
 Dancer 11: Reginald Lebron Camacho
 Dancer 12: Giancarlo Ramirez Martinez
 B-Boy Dancer 1: Alex Cruz
 B-Boy Dancer 2: Angel Rodríguez  
 B-Boy Dancer 3: Omar Martínez
 B-Boy Dancer 4: Nathael Vélez
 B-Boy Dancer 5: José Marques
 B-Boy Dancer 6: José Marrero
 B-Boy Dancer 7: Jaime Espinal
 B-Boy Dancer 8: Luis Rosado

Misc
 Show Designer: Liz Imperio
 Stylist: Luis Antonio
 Hair and Make-up: Felix Hernandez
 Invited Guest: Ken-Y, Jadiel, La Sista, Divino, and Wisin & Yandel

Charts

References

2008 live albums
2008 compilation albums
Ivy Queen live albums
Albums produced by Luny Tunes
Albums produced by Swizz Beatz
Albums produced by Rafy Mercenario
Albums produced by Noriega
Albums produced by Draco Rosa
Albums produced by Ivy Queen
Machete Music compilation albums